L. plantarum may refer to:
Lactobacillus plantarum
Lactococcus plantarum